Events from the year 1704 in Denmark.

Incumbents
 Monarch – Frederick IV
 Grand Chancellor – Conrad von Reventlow

Events

Undated
 Ole Rømer opens his Observatorium Tusculanum in Vridsløselille.
 Vitus Bering enrolls with the Imperial Russian Navy.
 The new Kommercekollegiet is set up,

Births
 4 April – Andreas Brünniche, painter (died 1763)

Deaths
 16 April – Ulrik Frederik Gyldenløve, statesman and military officer (born 1638)
 17 June – Georg Franck von Franckenau, physician and botanist (born 1641 in Germany)
 27 June – Elisabeth Helene von Vieregg, noble and lady-in-waiting (born 1679 in Germany)
 30 October – Princess Frederica Amalia of Denmark, princess (born 1649)

References

 
1700s in Denmark
Denmark
Years of the 18th century in Denmark